Pierre-Luc Poulin (born December 21, 1995) is a Canadian sprint kayaker. He won several World Cup and international medals.

In May 2021, Poulin was named to Canada's 2020 Olympic team.

References

1995 births
Canadian male canoeists
Canoeists at the 2015 Pan American Games
French Quebecers
Living people
Pan American Games bronze medalists for Canada
Sportspeople from Quebec City
Pan American Games medalists in canoeing
Medalists at the 2015 Pan American Games
Canoeists at the 2020 Summer Olympics
Olympic canoeists of Canada
20th-century Canadian people
21st-century Canadian people